The following is a list of players who captained the Fitzroy Football Club in the Australian Football League (AFL), formerly the VFL.

References

Fitzroy Lions Honour Roll

Fitzroy
Captains
Fitzroy Football Club captains